KIS was the name of a Polish  submachine gun from the time of the Second World War. It was designed and manufactured by engineers in Jan Piwnik's "Ponury" ("Grim") partisan group that was operating in Holy Cross Mountains region.

The weapon was patterned after Sten, retaining its left-side magazine. Main differences were a longer barrel, with conical rear part, and lack of stock – the gun had a pistol grip instead.

See also
 Błyskawica submachine gun

References

Bibliography
Kazimierz Satora - "Produkcja Uzbrojenia w Polskim Ruch Oporu 1939-45", Warszawa 1985
Kazimierz Satora "Podziemne zbrojownie polskie 1939-1944", Dom Wydawniczy Bellona, Warszawa 2001

External links
KIS photos
Polish Underground Sten Gun Production During World War Two

Insurgency weapons
World War II submachine guns
Submachine guns of Poland
9mm Parabellum submachine guns